The 13th Indian Cavalry Brigade was a cavalry brigade of the British Indian Army that formed part of the Indian Army during the First World War.  It remained in India throughout the war.

History
The 13th Indian Cavalry Brigade was formed under 4th (Quetta) Division in September 1918.  It took command of three cavalry regiments, newly formed with squadrons from Egypt:
 43rd Cavalry formed in August 1918 from
a squadron of 6th King Edward's Own Cavalry
a squadron of 9th Hodson's Horse
a squadron of 18th King George's Own Lancers
another squadron
 44th Cavalry formed in August 1918 from
a squadron of 2nd Lancers (Gardner's Horse)
a squadron of 19th Lancers (Fane's Horse)
a squadron of 29th Lancers (Deccan Horse)
another squadron
 45th Cavalry formed in August 1918 from
a squadron of 20th Deccan Horse
a squadron of 34th Prince Albert Victor's Own Poona Horse
a squadron of 36th Jacob's Horse
a squadron of 38th King George's Own Central India Horse
The brigade remained with the division throughout the First World War.  It was commanded from 1 September 1918 by Brigadier-General G.A.H. Beatty.  All three constituent regiments were disbanded in 1919.

See also

 13th Cavalry Brigade (British Indian Army) existed at the same time but was unrelated other than having the same number

Notes

References

Bibliography

External links
 

C13
Cavalry brigades of the British Indian Army
Military units and formations established in 1918